Yeniyapan is a village in the Polateli District, Kilis Province, Turkey. The village had a population of 594 in 2022.

References

Villages in Polateli District